Messick may refer to:

Places
 Messick, Indiana, United States
 Messick, Virginia, one of the towns incorporated into the independent city of Poquoson, Virginia in 1975, United States

People
 Dale Messick (1906–2005), American comic strip artist
 Don Messick (1926–1997), American voice actor
 Jill Messick, (1967-2018), American film producer
 John Decatur Messick (1897–1993), American university president
 Samuel Messick (1931–1998), American psychologist

Ships
 USS W. L. Messick (SP-322), a minesweeper that served in the United States Navy from 1917 to 1919.